The Convention on the Exercise of Liberal Professions of 1889 is a treaty signed in the First South American Congress of Private International Law of 1889 in Montevideo, by which allows holders of an academic degree obtained in a public education institution of a state party to automatically validate their degrees in another state party without any requirement other than displaying the degree and prove that its owner is the one who is asking the validation. This treaty binds Argentina, Bolivia, Colombia, Ecuador, Paraguay, Peru and Uruguay.

Parties

References

External links 

Conflict of laws
1889 treaties
Treaties of Argentina
Treaties of Bolivia
Treaties of Colombia
Treaties of Ecuador
Treaties of Paraguay
Treaties of Peru
Treaties of Uruguay